This is a chronological list of Zimbabwean wicket-keepers, that is, Test cricketers who have kept wicket in a match for Zimbabwe. Figures do not include catches made when the player was a non wicket-keeper.

See also
List of Zimbabwean Test cricketers

External links
Zimbabwe wicket-keepers

Wicket-keepers
Zimbabwe
Zimbabwe
Wicket-keepers